Metamora Township High School (often referred to as MTHS) is a public high school located in Metamora, Illinois, United States, with an enrollment of approximately 1,000 students. The school's athletic teams compete in the Mid-Illini Conference.  Its colors are red, white, and black.

History

Early records of education in Metamora date back to 1836, when students attended classes taught in a log house by Betty Page.  The village's first public school was built in 1845.  This building was sold in 1850 and a more substantial two-story building was constructed on the corner of Partridge and Hanover Streets, offering a one-year high school curriculum.  This structure was used until 1872 when it burnt down and a new building was built in its place.  Built at a cost of $8000 by Soloman E. Egbert, the two-story brick building featured 4 rooms, a grammar department being on the lower floor and a high school being on the second.  With an enrollment of 32 students and 4 teachers in its first year of operation in its new building, the school added a second year to its secondary curriculum in 1878.  In 1896, another teacher was added at the intermediate level and a third year was added to the high school program.  During this time, the Sisters of Saint Francis operated an orphanage on Madison Street in the village.  When the orphanage moved to Peoria in 1915, the Metamora school board purchased the grounds, added a fourth year and several additional classes to the secondary curriculum, and established Metamora Township High School District 122.

Metamora Township High School was established on October 11, 1915 and has functioned as a public high school ever since.  With an original enrollment of 60, the school has experienced much growth and expansion since then.  Most recently,  profound population growth in both Metamora and neighboring Germantown Hills saw a significant expansion of MTHS in 2000.  In 2008, MTHS moved toward alternative energy with the construction of a 165-foot meteorological tower adjacent to the school's grounds, aimed at educating students about weather science and assessing the possibility of a permanent wind turbine to power the school.

Issues and controversies
In 2003, the high school served as the principal location for The Only Way, an independent film about a school shooting produced by two former students of the school. While the film proved to be a valuable educational tool, the school's involvement in its production sparked concern and controversy among some parents of students at the school.

The high school parking lot has a capacity of about 350 vehicles; about 100 additional vehicles have to park elsewhere.  Each spring, the high school receives complaints that students have come too far into soft grass in private yards when parking on village streets, which have no curbs.  , Solutions with cost estimates vary from $46,500 to $615,000.

A large food fight in May 2009, on the last day for senior students, involved about 75 students, 60 of which were seniors.  Several students other than seniors were suspended.  Seniors who were known to have participated were not allowed to participate in the formal graduation ceremony.

Between the 2017 and 2018 school years, a short, inappropriate film was created by a group of freshman students (Class of 2021). The video contained explicate and derogatory terms regarding African-Americans. A single female student was responsible for sending this video to an African-American classmate, which sparked outrage among that student's family, the school's faculty, and an older African-American student who later confronted the male students in the video. The immediate course of action that Metamora took was to suspend all students involved: the group who created the video as well as the student who lashed out because of it. The central victim's family was on the verge of a lawsuit with the school for two months, but charges were dropped when the student most responsible was expelled. Because of the event, Metamora received one or more bomb threats within that same school year.

Campus
The school is located on Madison Street in northern Metamora.  It is bordered to the south by residential housing, to the west by a student parking lot, and to the east by McBride and Shoff, Inc. and Illinois Route 89.  To the north, the grounds comprise a large athletic complex, consisting of an outdoor track and football stadium (known as Malone Field), baseball and softball fields, and concrete tennis courts, along with practice fields for football and soccer.

The three-level building is divided into hallways and wings, each organized by the function it serves.  The school's west portion houses three gymnasiums, a cafeteria, and an auditorium.  The school's central portion, housing a library along with most of its classrooms and administrative offices, forms a two-story "H" with both levels following a similar layout.  The building's east portion sits at a level between the first and second floors, resembling a split-level design, and houses metal, wood, and automotive shops.  Two elevators make every classroom accessible to those with physical disabilities.

Academics
MTHS is the only school in Metamora Township High School District 122, independent of the three grade school districts that feed into it: Riverview Community Consolidated School District 2, Metamora Community Consolidated School District 1, and Germantown Hills School District 69.

The graduating class of 2010 had an average ACT score of 22.2, an average class size of 19.0, and a graduation rate of 98.3%.  For the 2009-10 school year, MTHS failed to make Adequate Yearly Progress (AYP) on the Prairie State Achievement Examination (PSAE), comprising the ACT and WorkKeys examination, the assessment tool used in Illinois to fulfill the No Child Left Behind Act.  However, the school has not been identified for School Improvement according to the AYP specification of the No Child Left Behind Act.

Extra-curricular activities

Metamora Township High School competes in the Mid-Illini Conference, in which it is the reigning All-Sports Champion (2008–2009).  MTHS is a member of the Illinois High School Association (IHSA), which governs most sports and activities in Illinois.  The school's teams are known as the Redbirds, except for the men's and women's cross-country teams, which are known as the Runnin' Red.

MTHS sponsors both men's and women's teams in basketball, cross-country, golf, soccer, tennis, and track & field.  The school also has men's baseball, football, and wrestling teams, as well as women's cheerleading, dance, softball, and volleyball teams.  Metamora also co-ops with Eureka High School to form a coed swimming & diving team.  Although not affiliated with the IHSA or the school, MTHS students may also compete on a men's rugby team.  The school also sponsors intramural basketball and badminton teams.

The following teams have qualified for their respective IHSA State tournament or meet:

Cross-Country (Men's): Qualified (1976–'77, '83–'84, '92–'93, '96–'97, '97–'98, 2003–'04, '04–'05, '05–'06, '06–'07, '08, '12, '16); 9th Place ('09–'10); 7th Place ('07–'08)
Cross-Country (Women's): Qualified (1970–'80, '91–'92, '94–'95, '95–'96, '96–'97, 2001–'02, '02–'03, '04–'05, '05–'06, '07–'08 '16); 6th Place (2008–'09); 5th Place (2003–'04)
Football: Qualified (1978–'79, '79–'80, '80–'81, '81–'82, '84–'85, '88–'89, '90–'91, '94–'95, '95–'96, '98–'99, 2001- '02, '02–'03, '03–'04, '04–'05, '05–'06, '06–'07, '11-'12, '12-'13, '14-'15); 2nd Place (1976–'77, '77–'78, '96–'97, '97'-98, '99–2000, '00–'01, '08–'09); State Champions (1975–'76, 2007–'08, '09–'10)
Softball: Qualified (1977–'78, '81–'82); State Champions (2009-'10)

The Metamora football program has several IHSA records, including most rushing yards by a team in a playoff game (633) and most State championship game losses (7).  Head coach Pat Ryan owns the individual coaching record for State championship game losses (5).

Fine Arts

Metamora boasts a strong fine arts program, with over half of all students being involved in fine arts as an extracurricular activity.  Currently, ensembles at the high school include a Wind Ensemble, concert band, jazz band, two steel bands, and a marching band.  The competitive marching band regularly competes in national competitions, visiting St. Louis and Indianapolis for the Bands of America (BOA) Regional and Grand National competitions, respectively.  The choir program includes three full choirs, a vocal jazz choir, and a madrigal group which puts on a full madrigal dinner each year.

Metamora is also home to the "Fluorescent Light Orchestra" (not to be confused with the more well-known Electric Light Orchestra), a popular group under the direction of Mike Damico.  The FLO plays such hits as "The Stripper," and "Ain't Misbehavin'."

Clubs and activities
:

 Archery
 Athletic Pep Bands
 Bass Fishing Club
 Campus Life (Youth for Christ)
 Car Club
 Chess Team
 Color Guard
 Digital Photography Club
 Drama Club / Spring Play
 Dungeons and Dragons Club
 E-Sports
 Fall Play
 Fellowship of Christian Athletes (FCA)
 Future Farmers of America (FFA)
 First Robotics
 German American Partnership Program (GAPP)
 German Dancers (Metamora Edelweiss Schuhplattler)
 Jazz Ensemble
 Key Club
 LAN Club
 Madrigals
 Madrigal Ensembles (instrumentals)
 Marching Band
 Math Team
 Medical Careers Club
 Musical
 National Honor Society
 Red Steel (steelpan band)
 Scholastic Bowl
 SkillsUSA
 Snowball
 Spanish Club
 Speech Team – Forensics
 Student Council
 The Flock
 Visual Arts Club
 Writers Club
 Worldwide Youth in Science and Engineering (WYSE)
 Yearbook

The following clubs and teams have qualified for their respective IHSA State competition or tournament:
Bass Fishing:  Qualified (2009-'10)

Notable alumni
Jacob Becraft, Co-founder of Strand Therapeutic and featured in MIT's 35under35.
Caleb TerBush (b. 1990), collegiate football quarterback at Purdue University
 Joshua Finnell, Associate Professor, Colgate University
Kenny Robertson, NCAA wrestler and professional Mixed Martial Artist, formerly competing in the UFC

References

External links

 Metamora Township High School — official site
  — website from 1998 to 2016

Educational institutions established in 1915
Public high schools in Illinois
School districts in Illinois
Schools in Woodford County, Illinois
1915 establishments in Illinois